Alexander Wolfe may refer to:

Alexander Wolfe (wrestler), German professional wrestler
Alexander Wolfe (musician), British musician